Marios Iliopoulos (born 16 December 1969 in Sydney, Australia) is a Greek guitarist and founder of the melodic death metal band Nightrage, and a former member of Exhumation.

After recording three albums with Exhumation (all of them produced in Sweden), Marios formed Nightrage along with fellow Greek guitar hero Gus G. Many prominent figures of metal such as Tomas Lindberg, Nicholas Barker, Tom S. Englund, Mikael Stanne, and Per Möller Jensen have collaborated with the band.

Marios has also made guest solo appearances for various artists, such as Dragonland, Dies Irae, Septic Flesh, Firewind, Mystic Prophecy and Universum. Marios also helped death metal band The Forsaken out on tour as bass player, and has been on tour with Firewind filling the same position.

Discography with Exhumation 
 Seas of Eternal Silence (1997)
 Dance Across The Past (1998)
 Traumaticon (1999)

Discography with Nightrage

Demo albums 
 Demo (2001)
 Demo 2 (2002)
 Demo 3 (2002)

Studio albums 
 Sweet Vengeance (2003)
 Descent into Chaos (2005)
 A New Disease Is Born (2007)
 Wearing A Martyr's Crown (2009)
 Vengeance Descending (2010)
 Insidious (2011)
 The Puritan (2015)
 The Venomous (2017)
 Wolf to Man (2019)

External links 
Nightrage official Website

1969 births
Living people
Greek rock guitarists
Greek heavy metal guitarists
Musicians from Thessaloniki
Nightrage members